Battle of Donur was a battle fought between the Cholas, during the reign of Raja Raja Chola I, and the Western Chalukya king Satyashraya at the town of Donur in Bijapur district, Karnataka, in southern India, in 1007 CE. The Cholas were led by crown-prince Rajendra Chola I.

Causes 

The Cholas had defeated the Gangas, weakened by the independence war waged against them by the Western Chalukyas, and conquered Gangapadi and Nolambapadi (Southern Karnataka and Andhra Pradesh).

Events 

According to an inscription of Satyasraya from Dharwad, Rajaraja Nittavinoda Rajendra Vidyadhara, ornament of the Chola race, Nurmudi-Chola (one-hundred-crown Chola) invaded the Western Chalukya Empire in 1007 AD with an army of 900,000 soldiers, carrying fire and sword throughout the region. The invading troops advanced as far as Donur in Bijapur district on their way to the Chalukya capital Manyakheta, where they were met by the Chalukya army under Satyashraya. The Tanjore big temple inscriptions state that Rajendra Chola I destroyed the Western Chalukya capital.

References

Bibliography 

 

11th century in India
Donur
Donur
Bijapur, Karnataka
Western Chalukya Empire
1007 in Asia